Maxillaria triloris, the three-straped maxillaria, is a species of orchid ranging from northwestern Venezuela to Ecuador.

References

External links 

triloris
Orchids of Ecuador
Orchids of Venezuela